Thomaston is the name of several places in the United States of America:
Thomaston, Alabama
Thomaston, Connecticut, a New England town
Thomaston (CDP), Connecticut, the main village in the town
Thomaston, Georgia
Thomaston, Indiana
Thomaston, Maine, a New England town
Thomaston (CDP), Maine, census-designated place within the town
Thomaston, New York
Thomaston, Texas
South Thomaston, Maine